"Porifericola" is a genus from the family of Flammeovirgaceae with one known species ("Porifericola rhodea").

References

Further reading 
 

Sphingobacteriia
Bacteria genera
Monotypic bacteria genera